The 1965 UC Santa Barbara Gauchos football team represented University of California, Santa Barbara (UCSB) during the 1965 NCAA College Division football season.

UCSB competed as an Independent in 1965. The team was led by third-year head coach "Cactus Jack" Curtice, and played home games at La Playa Stadium in Santa Barbara, California. They finished the regular season with a record of eight wins and one loss (8–1).

At the end of the season, the Gauchos qualified for a postseason bowl game, the 1965 Camellia Bowl, played in Sacramento, California. The lost the game against Cal State Los Angeles 10–18. That brought their final record to eight wins and two losses (8–2). For the 1965 season they outscored their opponents 225–95.

Jack Curtice won the AFCA Coach of the Year for the 1965 NCAA football season NCAA Division II.

Schedule

Team players in the NFL
No Santa Barbara Gaucho players were selected in the 1966 NFL Draft.

The following finished their UC Santa Barbara career in 1965, were not drafted, but played in the NFL/AFL.

Notes

References

UC Santa Barbara
UC Santa Barbara Gauchos football seasons
UC Santa Barbara Gauchos football